Ana Šimić (born 5 May 1990) is a Croatian athlete who competes in the high jump. She competed at the 2012, 2016, and 2020 Summer Olympics.

Competition record

References

External links

1990 births
Living people
People from Gradačac
Croatian female high jumpers
Athletes (track and field) at the 2012 Summer Olympics
Athletes (track and field) at the 2016 Summer Olympics
Athletes (track and field) at the 2020 Summer Olympics
Olympic athletes of Croatia
World Athletics Championships athletes for Croatia
European Athletics Championships medalists
Athletes (track and field) at the 2013 Mediterranean Games
Mediterranean Games medalists in athletics
Mediterranean Games gold medalists for Croatia
Competitors at the 2011 Summer Universiade
20th-century Croatian women
21st-century Croatian women